Harpalomorphus is a genus of beetles in the family Carabidae first described by Louis Péringuey in 1896.

Species 
Harpalomorphus contains the following seven species:
 Harpalomorphus aeneipennis Peringuey, 1896
 Harpalomorphus capicola Peringuey, 1896
 Harpalomorphus minor Facchini, 2011
 Harpalomorphus modestus Peringuey, 1896
 Harpalomorphus pseudocapicola Facchini, 2011
 Harpalomorphus rufipennis Peringuey, 1896
 Harpalomorphus sinuaticollis Facchini, 2011

References

Harpalinae